Meredith Edwards may refer to:

Meredith Edwards (singer), American singer
Meredith Edwards (actor), Welsh actor